The Treaty of the More was concluded on 30 August 1525 between Henry VIII and the interim French government of Louise of Savoy. It was celebrated by Henry and the French ambassadors at the More, Hertfordshire, a castle owned by Henry's chief minister, Cardinal Wolsey.

England, with Wolsey negotiating, agreed to give up some territorial claims on France, receiving in return a pension from the French of £20,000 a year. France settled what was owed to Henry VIII's sister, Mary, dowager queen of France. England also agreed to work to secure the release of King Francis of France, then held prisoner by Charles V, Holy Roman Emperor and King of Spain.

England had been troubled by the threat of a renewal of the "Auld Alliance" between France and Scotland, and France agreed to prevent the Scottish Duke of Albany from returning to Scotland.

References

Treaties of England
Treaties involving territorial changes
1525 in England
1525 in France
Treaties of the Kingdom of France
Tudor England
1525 treaties